Gerald Mauroka Baker (born April 4, 1962) was an American law enforcement officer who served as Sheriff of Wake County, North Carolina from December 2018 until December 2022 at the end of term.

Baker was defeated in a second Democratic primary election in July of 2022 by  now Sheriff, Willlie Rowe.

Career
Baker unseated four term sheriff for Wake County Donnie Harrison on 6 November 2018 in United States elections, 2018 from the platform of Democratic Party. He defeated Harrison by 55 to 45 percent of votes. He has been serving in sheriff's office for twenty-eight years out of which fifteen were under Harrison. Baker has been critical of federal immigration program while Harrison fully cooperated with it.

References

Living people
Sheriffs of Wake County, North Carolina
1962 births
North Carolina Democrats